Sami Worship Taoufik (born 27 February 2002) is a Spanish-born Moroccan racing driver.

Career

Early career 
Born in Barcelona and based in Spain, Taoufik began karting in 2007, at age of five, and claimed four Spanish Championship titles.

He competed for two seasons in the OK Junior category between 2015 and 2016, year in which he won the WSK Super Master Series OKJ with the British team Ricky Flynn Motorsport.

The following year, he moved to the OK and won the 2017 CIK-FIA European Championship with the same team.
Also awarded the 2017 Rookie of the year award by the FIA at only 16 the youngest in their history.

Formula Renault 
In March 2018, Sami signed with Arden International to take part in the Formula Renault Eurocup.

Racing record

Career summary

† As Taoufik was a guest driver, he was ineligible for points.

Complete TCR Europe Touring Car Series results
(key) (Races in bold indicate pole position) (Races in italics indicate fastest lap)

References

External links
 

2002 births
Living people
Moroccan racing drivers
Spanish sportspeople of Moroccan descent
Formula Renault Eurocup drivers
Formula Renault 2.0 NEC drivers
Arden International drivers
Racing drivers from Barcelona
Karting World Championship drivers
Sébastien Loeb Racing drivers
UAE F4 Championship drivers
Comtoyou Racing drivers
TCR Europe Touring Car Series drivers